Mary Grant (born 27 February 1949) is a former archer who represented Canada at the 1972 Summer Olympic Games in archery.

Olympics 

At the 1972 Summer Olympic Games she competed in the women's individual event and finished eleventh with a total of 2350 points.

References

External links 
 Profile on worldarchery.org

1949 births
Living people
Canadian female archers
Olympic archers of Canada
Archers at the 1972 Summer Olympics